Adrian Jarvis (born 12 December 1983) is an English rugby union footballer who played as fly half for Bristol in the RFU Championship.

In 2007–08 he was called into the England Saxons squad to face Italy A in Ragusa, Sicily on 9 February 2008.

On 3 March 2017, Jarvis announced his retirement from professional rugby.

Jarvis is now in a full time role coaching rugby at a boys' school called QEH, Bristol (Queen Elizabeth's Hospital), as Head of Rugby. His main role is also 1st XV backs coach, with him also aiding the development of the 7s team, while also teaching A-level and 
GCSE Business

References

External links
 England profile
 Harlequins profile
 Profile and Statistics (itsrugby.com)
 Statbunker profile

1983 births
Living people
English rugby union players
Bristol Bears players
Harlequin F.C. players
Rugby union players from London
Rugby union fly-halves